The National 99er Pairs national bridge championship was held at the fall American Contract Bridge League (ACBL) North American Bridge Championship (NABC) until discontinued in 2013. The National 99er Pairs was a one-day two-session matchpoint pairs event, restricted to players with under 100 masterpoints and typically started on the second Friday of the NABC.

Winners

Sources

1998 winners, Page 11

1999 winners, Page 7

2000 winners, Page 6

2001 winners, Page 1

2002 winners, Page 1

2003 winners, Page 1

2004 winners, Page 1

2005 winners, Page 1

2006 winners, Page 1

2007 winners, Page 1

2008 winners, Page 1

References

External links
ACBL official website National 99er Winners

North American Bridge Championships